Robert Kya-Hill ( Robert Hill; born December 4, 1930, Whitakers, North Carolina) is an American actor, director, playwright, musician, composer, and educator. He also performed under the name "Bob Hill". On learning that there was an actor with the same name, he briefly changed his name to Robert Hill II. He then added the prefix "Kya" after joining the Screen Actors Guild in 1961 because a union rule barred members from having the same name.

Early years and education 
Kya-Hill's youth on farms in North Carolina and Virginia's Bible Belt country influenced his later works. At the age of 12, he moved to Harlem in New York City with his mother, Fannie Williams Hill, a garment presser. After graduation as a silk screen major from the High School of Industrial Arts in 1948, he worked in the silk screen industry and then attended City College of New York in 1950-51.
 
Because he loved to sing but could not find a piano accompanist, he taught himself to play the guitar. He also went to music auditions for singing practice because he could not afford lessons. His formal music studies were deferred until after Army service in Germany during the Korean War. He was discharged in 1953 with a National Defense Service Medal and an Army of Occupation Medal Germany.

From 1954 to 1957, he studied at the New York College of Music and Jarahal School of Music in Harlem, where he conducted the Jarahal Concert Chorus for two seasons.  At Jarahal, he also became an acting student and then protégé of the vaudeville performer, Lillyn Brown. He also studied with private teachers including Herbert Gellendre, Vinettte Carroll and Carol Vikse.  As his interests diversified, so did his mixed-media program credits, sometimes by choice and sometimes by budgetary constraints. In 1991, he earned an M.A in Theater Education from Goddard College in Plainfield, Vermont.

Professional career 
Robert Kya-Hill's extensive and diverse career began as a folk musician in 1958 with performances as a guitarist, folk singer, and concert soloist.  He appeared in Let My People Go in New York's Town Hall, with Lillyn Brown's one-woman shows in Carnegie Recital Hall, and nightclubs in Manhattan, Connecticut, and New Jersey.

For several years, he appeared as guitarist and actor, including as Gorman in Dark of the Moon, with James Earl Jones in 1959 at Equity Library Theatre in Manhattan.  He was billed as Robert Hill II when he appeared as Ketch and guitarist in the 1962 production of Moon on a Rainbow Shawl, at East 11th Street Theater in New York City which starred James Earl Jones and Cicely Tyson. Eventually, his career transitioned to acting, composing, playwriting, directing, then into teaching and back into acting and composing.

By intentionally auditioning for plays with no roles for African Americans, Kya-Hill sought to broaden casting directors' preconceptions and thereby increase employment for blacks. Although Kya-Hill was not often selected for roles, he nevertheless appeared on stages in New York, regionally, and abroad in more than 140 professional productions.

As Bob Hill, he played the lead in Dark Valley, Gospel Films, 1961, and was awarded the "Christian Oscar" by the National Evangelical Film Foundation (NEFF) for Best Actor of the Year.  His role as Jericho in Slaves, produced by Theatre Guild Films in 1969 and released by Walter Reade was praised as "excellent" by the Boston Herald.  Terry Kay in The Atlanta Journal described him as "a remarkably talented actor," adding "Kya-Hill is the finest actor in the cast, which includes Stephen Boyd, Ossie Davis, and Dionne Warwick." He reveals "a peculiar and magnificent fire, an unleashed freedom of acting 'attack' that breaks the conventions of characteristic posing too often committed by other performers."

In 1969, his performance as Purlie in Purlie Victorious at the Equity Library Theatre in New York earned an Obie Award nomination as best actor. He performed the title role in Othello numerous times, including in Montreal, Vermont, New York City, and Perth, Australia. When cast as a last-minute replacement for Stephen Kumalo, the lead in Lost in the Stars, he learned the entire role and music in only three days before opening night. He has played leading roles in New York City, regional and international theaters. He also performed with touring companies, as Young Dr. Martin Luther King, Jr., written by Alice Childress, and Josef K, a dramatization by Andre Gide and Jean-Barrault of Kafka's The Trial; and with repertory companies such as the American Shakespeare Festival in Stratford, Connecticut.

His play, The Trial of Secundus Generation Blackman vs. Hannah and William Blackman was produced in June 1968 by Theater West in Dayton, Ohio.  Writing in the Journal-Herald, Hubert Meeker expressed feeling "the excitement of the submerged Negro culture surfacing in new artistic shape, with the implication in this beginning trickle of a tremendous underground vitality that could break through and revolutionize the American stage." The play was also performed at the Hunter College Playhouse in March 1972 with the shortened title, Blackman vs Blackman. It was directed by Kya-Hill and choreographed by Pearl Primus. Another play, The System, had been submitted to Clarence Young, III, in Dayton in 1968 and later widely performed without his knowledge or being credited. Its performance by Theatre West at the Lincoln Center Community/Street Festival in August 1972 prompted Mel Gussow in his favorable New York Times review to observe, "Although not individually credited in the program, Clarence Young, 3, a playwright, is apparently the man most responsible for the success of The System."  Other plays by Kya-Hill that were produced include Guilt the Touch of Death and Nat Turner: Slave.

Kya-Hill's oratorio, The Gospel According to John and …, was premiered in a special performance at Rutgers Presbyterian Church, New York City, on May 19, 1968, with Elizabeth Mosher and Edmond Karlsrud among the soloists. He also composed the film score for Dark Valley and wrote music for his play, Revelation, for the Time is at Hand as well as numerous plays he directed or appeared in, among them J.B., Nat Turner, Moon on a Rainbow Shawl, The Ballad of Joe Smith, Yerma. His music for the 1968 production of Purlie Victorious at the Erie Playhouse in Erie, PA earned high praise in the Erie, PA Times on May 4, 1968: "This was the first 'non-musical' this reviewer has seen where the audience went out humming the music from the show".
 
He was director of the New York City Festival of the Arts in 1964, presented by the Afro-Arts Cultural Center and sponsored by several New York City agencies. Other credits include The Ballad of Joe Smith, Theater for Peace in New York City. It was reviewed as "masterfully staged by Robert Kya-Hill, who has seized all of the visual and physical implications" and his performance "by far the best in the play."   In 1974-75 at the McCree Theatre & Fine Arts Centre in Flint, Michigan, he directed The Revelation of Jesus Christ…for the Time is at Hand, which he also wrote, composed music for, and narrated. The program contains his statement that since theater evolved from the church, "why shouldn't believers use theater to spread the Word … for what is important is not popularity and security, but the salvation of souls."  In Perth, Australia, 1975–76, he directed several plays, including a dual cast student production of The Glass Menagerie at the Theatre-Go-Round and Wole Soyinka's The Trials of Brother Jero at the Octagon Theatre with a cast from all over Africa. He also directed Abby Lincoln in The Gingerbread Lady at the Ebony Theater in Los Angeles.

As an educator, he created and taught the first Black Theater studies course at Hunter College, New York City in 1972-74, where he also taught acting in addition to performing and directing. He added playwriting in 1975-76 when he was appointed artist-in-residence at the Western Australian Institute of Technology (now Curtin University). From 1983-99 he taught drama subjects, English and music in New York City's junior and senior high schools, as well as private acting and guitar. After retiring, he returned to the theatre. His work mainly focused on supporting the careers of aspiring actors, playwrights, and filmmakers. He also continued composing music.

Personal 
He married his wife Sally in 1966; they have one daughter, Bouqui.

Film and television 
1961: Dark Valley - Jason
1969: The Pony Film - Father
1969: Slaves - Jericho
1970: Edge of Night (TV Series) - Apollo
1971: Another World - Frank Chadwick
1972: Shaft's Big Score! - Cal Asby
1972: Rivals - Second Policeman
1973: One Life to Live (TV Series) - Hogan
1974: Death Wish - Joe Charles
1974: Roots: The Next Generations (TV Mini-Series) - Minister
1977: The Court-Martial of George Armstrong Custer (TV Movie) - Henry
1978: The Perfect Gentleman - Harry Blount 
1978: Good Times - J.J.'s boss
1978: Lou Grant - Foreign News Editor
1978: Eight is Enough (TV Series) - Trucking Company Owner
1978: The Critical List (TV Movie) - Judge
1980: Sanford Arms - Businessman neighbor
1980: Kaz - Ex-Convict
1997: Sue Lost in Manhattan - Willie
1999: The Shade Seller
2001: Beirut - Minister
2012: Celeste and Jesse Forever - Priest
2012: The Good Wife - Father

Stage 
 1963   Abe Lincoln in Illinois, as Gobey, Phoenix Theatre, New York City
 1964	 The Beggar's Opera, as Matt, Equity Library Theatre, New York City
 1966   Winterset, as Shadow, Jan Hus Theatre, New York City
 1966-67 Lost in the Stars, as Stephen Kumalo; Noah (Wakefield Mystery Plays), as Noah; King Lear, as Kent, Morris Repertory Theatre, Morristown, NJ
 1967	 The Merchant of Venice, as Prince of Morocco; Julius Caesar, as Pindarus, Soothsayer, American Shakespeare Festival, Stratford, CT
 1968 	 The Ballad of Joe Smith, as Old Man, Theater for Peace, Playwrights' Workshop Club, NYC
 1968	 Purlie Victorious, as Purlie, Erie Playhouse, Erie, PA
 1968	 The Trial, as Josef K, Vanguard Theater, Pittsburgh, PA
 1969	 Purlie Victorious, as Purlie, Equity Library Theatre, New York City
 1969	Young Martin Luther King, Jr., as Martin Luther King Jr., Performing Arts Repertory Theatre, 4 -State tour	
 1969	 Irma La Douce, as Persil, Dallas Summer Musicals, Dallas, TX 
 1969	 Othello, as Othello, Champlain Shakespeare Festival, Burlington, VT
 1970   The Trial of A. Lincoln, as Lucius Richardson, Hartford Stage Company, Hartford, CT
 1970	 Poetry Now!, as Performer, Periwinkle Productions, multi-state tour
 1970	 Othello, as Othello, Centaur Theatre Company, Montreal, Canada
 1971	 F. Jasmine Addams, as T.T. Williams, Circle in the Square, New York City
 1972	 The Legacy, One-Man Show, Brecht West, Princeton, NJ
 1973-74 Between Two Worlds, with Maureen Hurley, multi-state tour
 1974-75 Revelation…for the Time is at Hand, as John, McCree Theatre, Flint, MI
 1975-76 The Tempest, as Caliban; Othello as Othello, Hayman Theatre, Perth, Australia
 1981	The Merchant of Venice, as Prince of Morocco, Clarence Brown Theatre, Knoxville, TN
 1984	The New Mt. Olive Motel, as Sid Ross, J. Pellmann Theatre, Milwaukee, WI
 1993	Take Me Along, as Dave McComber, Performing Arts Center, Inc., New York City
 2002	 Standard of the Breed, Chuck, The Beckmann Theatre, New York City
 2002	 The Phoenician Women, Kreon/Tutor, The Ohio Theatre, New York City
 2003	 Betty Smith in 1-Act: Vine Leaves, as Mr. Leeper; Freedom's Bird, as Sam; Lawyer Lincoln, as Judge Davis, The Royal Theatre, Williamsburg/Brooklyn, NY
 2004	Sin Paradise, as Jasper, The Puerto Rican Traveling Theatre, New York City
 2005	Einstein's Secret Letters, as Paul Robeson, Soho Rep/Walker Space, New York City
 2005	The Later Medead, as Aegus, Tramway Theatre, Glasgow, Scotland
 2006	Medea in Aia, Section 1 of The Medead, LMCC Swing Space, New York City
 2006	The Prostitute of Reverie Valley, as John, Players Loft, New York City
 2007	Driving Miss Daisy, as Hoke, Riverside Theatre, Vero Beach, FL
 2007	Flight, as Charlie Parker, Metropolitan Playhouse, New York City
 2008	The Tunnel, as Old Man, Axial Theatre, Pleasantville, NY
 2009	Union, as Dr. Jone, Axial Theatre, Pleasantville, NY
 2010 	Shotgun, as Dexter, Florida Studio Theatre, Sarasota, FL

References

External links
 

1930 births
Living people
People from Whitakers, North Carolina